Mullakkal is an area in Alappuzha district in the state of Kerala, India. It is part of Alappuzha municipality. This is the main town center of the Alleppey town.

References

Villages in Alappuzha district